Meaulne is a former commune in the Allier department in central France. On 1 January 2017, it was merged into the new commune Meaulne-Vitray.

Population

See also
Communes of the Allier department

References

Former communes of Allier
Allier communes articles needing translation from French Wikipedia
Populated places disestablished in 2017